Musical Romance (foaled 2007 in Florida) was an American National Champion Thoroughbred racemare purchased for $22,000 who is best known for her 2011 win of the $1,000,000 Breeders' Cup Filly & Mare Sprint hosted that year by Churchill Downs. Ridden by Juan Leyva, she was trained by Bill Kaplan, co-owner with the Pinnacle Racing Stable headed by managing partner Adam Lazarus.

Background
Bred in Florida by the O'Farrell family's Ocala Stud, Musical Romance was sired by Concorde’s Tune and out of the mare Candlelightdinner, by Slew Gin Fizz. While not from the most fashionable of bloodlines, her Breeders' Cup biography says that "speedsters abound in her family tree."

Musical Romance was purchased for $22,000 by Adam Lazarus and trainer Bill Kaplan at the 2009 Ocala Breeders' Sales Company sale of juveniles. Lazarus then sold shares in his fifty percent to a group of investors. During her second day of training the Musical Romance suffered a fracture of the pastern, the part of the leg between the fetlock and the hoof.

Racing career
The injury meant it was not until September 19, 2009 that Musical Romance could make her racing debut at Calder Race Course, a Florida facility where she remained for all her starts as a two-year-old. Beginning with three events for maidens, she finished third then fourth before getting her first win on October 23. Beaten in her next three starts, Musical Romance began her three-year-old campaign on January 23, 2010 at Gulfstream Park with a victory in an allowance race. Four starts later she got her first stakes win in Calder's Sweettrickydancer Stakes. She ended 2010 with one more win in an allowance optional claiming race plus she earned two seconds and three third-place finishes in other stakes races.

2011 Championship year
Having previously been raced almost exclusively at distances of 1 1/16 to 1 1/8 miles at age three, trainer Bill Kaplan entered Musical Romance in sprint distances beginning in 2011. Racing at Gulfstream Park and Calder Race Course, between January 1 and April 10 of 2011 Musical Romance made five starts, finishing fourth three times and fifth in the two others. However, she began to show her preference for the shorter distances and ran best when she lay off the pace until making a move coming down the stretch.

Musical Romance had a second place result in the Hollywood Wildcat Handicap before winning the Ema Bovary Stakes and the U Can Do It Handicap. Moved up to top level competition in Calder's Grade 1 Princess Rooney Handicap she ran second by a neck to Sassy Image then, still at Calder, followed up with a win in the Barb's Dancer Stakes. In September, Musical Romance was shipped to Pennsylvania's Presque Isle Downs for the $400,000 Masters Stakes. Run at 6 1/2 furlongs on an all weather track, she got her first Grade 2 stakes win. In her next start at Keeneland in Lexington, Kentucky, she ran second in the 6 furlong Thoroughbred Club of America Stakes to Holiday for Kitten owned by Ken and Sarah Ramsey. At this point, Musical Romance had earned close to $700,000 for her owners who made the decision to pay a $130,000 supplemental fee to enter her in the million dollar Breeders' Cup Filly & Mare Sprint to be run November 4 at Churchill Downs in Louisville, Kentucky. Riding in his first ever Breeders' Cup race, Musical Romance's regular jockey Juan Leyva immediately moved her to be on the rail by the time the horses reached the first turn. Running behind the early leader until coming down the stretch for home, she charged between the two front runners to win by 1 1/4 lengths and take first money of $540,000.

Musical Romance would be voted the Eclipse Award as the 2001 American Champion Female Sprint Horse and named Florida's 2011 Horse of the Year.

2012, the final year of racing and sale
In 2012, the now five-year-old Musical Romance won the Grade 1 Princess Rooney Handicap and the Mike Sherman Memorial Stakes at Calder Race Course plus the Grade 2 Inside Information Stakes at Gulfstream Park. She returned to defend her title in the Breeders' Cup Filly & Mare Sprint, hosted in 2012 by California's Santa Anita Park. Musical Romance struggled and never threatened the leaders, finishing far back in sixth behind winner Groupie Doll.

Musical Romance was sold in the November 5, 2012 Fasig-Tipton sale for $1.6 million. She was purchased by the prominent Japanese breeder Katsumi Yoshida to stand as a broodmare at his Northern Farm on the island of Hokkaido in Japan.

As of 2021, Musical Romance was produced three foals by Deep Impact and another by Heart's Cry.

Pedigree

External links
 Video of Musical Romance's win in the 2011 Breeders Cup Filly & Mare Sprint

References

2007 racehorse births
Racehorses bred in Florida
Racehorses trained in the United States
American Champion racehorses
Eclipse Award winners
Breeders' Cup Filly & Mare Sprint winners
American Grade 1 Stakes winners
Thoroughbred family 10-a